Thomas C. Bruice (August 25, 1925 – February 15, 2019) was a professor of chemistry and biochemistry at University of California, Santa Barbara. He was elected to the National Academy of Sciences in 1974. He was a pioneering researcher in the area of chemical biology, and is one of the 50 most cited chemists.

Education
 
Bruice earned his B.S. at  the University of Southern California, and returned there after his service as a Marine medical corpsman during the World War II island campaigns in the South Pacific, and obtained his Ph.D. there. He carried out post-doctoral work at University of California, Los Angeles. He has been a faculty member at Yale University, Johns Hopkins University, and Cornell University. He joined the faculty at the University of California, Santa Barbara in 1964.

Research

Papers

Bruice published more than 600 papers during his career. He saw himself as a bioorganic chemist rather than as a biochemist, and that description is very apt for his work, as most of the molecules that he studied were natural products such as thyroxine. In addition, he made important contributions to understanding enzyme catalysis, and he pioneered the use of imidazole-catalysed hydrolysis  of p-nitrophenyl acetate as a model system. (This system has the practical advantage that it is very convenient to follow the hydrolysis spectrophotometically.) He also stied a similar reaction catalysed by the enzyme ribonuclease. More generally, he made a study of mechanisms for chymotrypsin catalysis., and in particular the "charge-relay" system as a way of understanding the role of the catalytic triad that exists in such enzymes. He considered that "orbital steering" was a new name for a well established observation.

Reviews

Bruice wrote reviews on a number of topics, including the use of small molecules to understand catalysis  and the chemistry of flavins, and on enzyme catalysis in general.

Books

Bruice collaborated with Stephen Benkovic to write a two-volume work on Bioorganic Mechanisms that helped establish this field.

Awards and honors
2008 - Linus Pauling Award
2005 - NAS Award in Chemical Sciences
1978 - Tolman Award

References

External links
Thomas Bruice's faculty page

1925 births
2019 deaths
American biochemists
Yale University faculty
Johns Hopkins University faculty
Cornell University faculty
University of California, Santa Barbara faculty
University of Southern California alumni
Members of the United States National Academy of Sciences
Deaths from cerebrovascular disease